"Just a Man" is a song by Australian indie rock band The Cruel Sea. The song was released in March 1995 as the second single from the band's fourth studio album, Three Legged Dog. The song peaked at number 39 on the ARIA Charts.

Track listing
 "Just a Man"	
 "Down the Stairs Backwards"	
 "See Ya Later"
 "Moby Dick"

Charts

References

The Cruel Sea (band) songs
1994 songs
1995 singles